

Days of the month

30 November 2012 (Friday)

Alpine skiing
Men's World Cup:
Downhill in Beaver Creek, United States:  Christof Innerhofer   Aksel Lund Svindal   Kjetil Jansrud 
Overall standings (after 5 of 36 races): (1) Svindal 280 points (2) Ted Ligety  170 (3) Marcel Hirscher  140
Downhill standings (after 2 of 9 races): (1) Svindal 180 points (2) Innerhofer 104 (3) Klaus Kröll  89
Women's World Cup:
Downhill in Lake Louise, Canada:  Lindsey Vonn   Stacey Cook   Maria Höfl-Riesch  and Tina Weirather 
Overall standings (after 5 of 37 races): (1) Tina Maze  321 points (2) Kathrin Zettel  260 (3) Höfl-Riesch 234

American football
NCAA Division I FBS (BCS standings in brackets):
MAC Championship Game in Detroit, Michigan: [21] Northern Illinois 44, [17] Kent State 37 (2OT).
Pac-12 Championship Game in Stanford, California: [8] Stanford 27, [16] UCLA 24.

29 November 2012 (Thursday)

28 November 2012 (Wednesday)

27 November 2012 (Tuesday)

26 November 2012 (Monday)

25 November 2012 (Sunday)

Alpine skiing
Men's World Cup:
Super Giant Slalom in Lake Louise, Canada:  Aksel Lund Svindal   Adrien Théaux   Joachim Puchner 
Overall standings (after 4 of 36 races): (1) Svindal 200 points (2) Ted Ligety  170 (3) Marcel Hirscher  140
Women's World Cup:
Slalom in Aspen, United States:  Kathrin Zettel   Marlies Schild   Tina Maze 
Overall standings (after 4 of 37 races): (1) Maze 310 points (2) Zettel 260 (3) Maria Höfl-Riesch  174
Slalom standings (after 2 of 11 races): (1) Höfl-Riesch 150 points (2) Tanja Poutiainen  112 (3) Maze 110

Auto racing
Formula One:
 in São Paulo, Brazil: (1) Jenson Button  (McLaren–Mercedes) (2) Fernando Alonso  (Ferrari) (3) Felipe Massa  (Ferrari)
Final drivers' championship standings: (1) Sebastian Vettel  (Red Bull–Renault) 281 points (2) Alonso 278 (3) Kimi Räikkönen  (Lotus-Renault) 207
Vettel wins his third consecutive World Championship.
Final constructors' championship standings: (1) Red Bull-Renault 460 points (2) Ferrari 400 (3) McLaren-Mercedes 378

Canadian football
Grey Cup in Toronto, Ontario: Toronto Argonauts 35, Calgary Stampeders 22.
Argonauts win the Grey Cup for the first time since 2004 and sixteenth time overall. Argonauts running back Chad Kackert is named Most Valuable Player.

Nordic combined
World Cup:
HS 138 / Penalty Race in Lillehammer, Norway:  Magnus Moan   Håvard Klemetsen   Eric Frenzel 
Standings (after 2 of 17 races): (1) Moan 200 points (2) Jason Lamy-Chappuis  and Klemetsen 130

Rugby union
End of year tests, Week 4:
In Le Havre, France: French Barbarians  65–41

24 November 2012 (Saturday)

Alpine skiing
Men's World Cup:
Downhill in Lake Louise, Canada:  Aksel Lund Svindal   Max Franz   Marco Sullivan  and Klaus Kröll 
Overall standings (after 3 of 36 races): (1) Marcel Hirscher  140 points (2) Manfred Mölgg  130 (3) Ted Ligety  120
Women's World Cup:
Giant Slalom in Aspen, United States:  Tina Maze   Kathrin Zettel   Viktoria Rebensburg 
Overall standings (after 3 of 37 races): (1) Maze 250 points (2) Zettel 160 (3) Maria Höfl-Riesch  124
Giant Slalom standings (after 2 of 9 races): (1) Maze 200 points (2) Zettel 160 (3) Irene Curtoni  77

American football
NCAA Division I FBS (BCS standings in brackets):
In Los Angeles, California: [1] Notre Dame 22, USC 13.
Notre Dame secures spot in the BCS National Championship Game after claiming the Jeweled Shillelagh to complete perfect 12–0 regular season.
In Logan, Utah: Utah State 45, Idaho 9.
Utah State, who will move to the MWC in 2013, wins their first WAC championship.
In Columbus, Ohio: Ohio State 26, [19] Michigan 21.
Ohio State, who is ineligible for any post-season bowl games due to NCAA sanctions, wins The Game to finish their season with perfect 12–0 record.

Nordic combined
World Cup:
HS 100 / 10 km in Lillehammer, Norway:  Magnus Moan   Jason Lamy-Chappuis   Bernhard Gruber

Rugby union
End of year tests, Week 4:
In Tbilisi, Georgia:  19–24 
In Dublin, Republic of Ireland:  46–24 
In Florence, Italy:  19–22 
In Bucharest, Romania:  3–34 
In London, England:  15–16 
In Aberdeen, Scotland:  15–21 
In Saint-Denis, France:  22–14 
In Cardiff, Wales:  10–33

Sumo
Kyūshū basho (November grand tournament) in Fukuoka, Japan:
Hakuhō Shō clinches the tournament for the first time since last March, and earns his 23rd makuuchi (top division) championship to surpass former yokozuna Takanohana Kōji for 5th on the all-time list.

23 November 2012 (Friday)

Canadian football
Vanier Cup in Toronto, Ontario: Laval Rouge et Or 37, McMaster Marauders 14.

Rugby union
End of year tests, Week 4:
In Oxford, England:  19–32

22 November 2012 (Thursday)

American football
NFL, Week 12:
Thanksgiving Day games:
In Detroit, Michigan: Houston Texans 34, Detroit Lions 31 (OT).
In Arlington, Texas: Washington Redskins 38, Dallas Cowboys 31.
Sunday Night Football in East Rutherford, New Jersey: New England Patriots 49, New York Jets 19.

21 November 2012 (Wednesday)

Rugby union
End of year tests, Week 4:
In Biarritz, France: Basque Selection  19–3

20 November 2012 (Tuesday)

Basketball
NCAA Division III Basketball: Grinnell Pioneers guard Jack Taylor scores an NCAA-record 138 points in a game in a 179–104 victory over Faith Baptist Bible.

19 November 2012 (Monday)

Baseball
World Baseball Classic Qualifier 4 Final in Panama City, Panama:  1,  0. Brazil qualifies for the main tournament in March 2013.

18 November 2012 (Sunday)

Auto racing
Formula One:
United States Grand Prix in Austin, Texas: (1) Lewis Hamilton  (McLaren–Mercedes) (2) Sebastian Vettel  (Red Bull–Renault) (3) Fernando Alonso  (Ferrari)
Drivers' championship standings (after 19 of 20 races): (1) Vettel 273 points (2) Alonso 260 (3) Kimi Räikkönen  (Lotus-Renault) 206
Constructors' championship standings: (1) Red Bull-Renault 440 points (2) Ferrari 367 (3) McLaren-Mercedes 353
Red Bull win their third consecutive title.
Sprint Cup Series – Chase for the Sprint Cup:
Ford EcoBoost 400 in Homestead, Florida: (1)  Jeff Gordon (Chevrolet; Hendrick Motorsports) (2)  Clint Bowyer (Toyota; Michael Waltrip Racing) (3)  Ryan Newman (Chevrolet; Stewart-Haas Racing)
Final drivers' championship standings: (1)  Brad Keselowski (Dodge; Penske Racing) 2400 points (2) Bowyer 2361 (3)  Jimmie Johnson (Chevrolet; Hendrick Motorsports) 2360
Keselowski wins his first Sprint Cup title.

Baseball
World Baseball Classic qualification:
Qualifier 3 in Panama City, Panama:  9,  7. Colombia is eliminated.
Qualifier 4 Final in New Taipei City, Taiwan:  9,  0. Chinese Taipei qualifies for the main tournament in March 2013.

Canadian football
CFL playoffs:
East Division Final in Montreal, Quebec: Toronto Argonauts 27, Montreal Alouettes 20.
West Division Final in Vancouver, British Columbia: Calgary Stampeders 34, BC Lions 29.

Futsal
FIFA World Cup in Thailand:
Third place match in Bangkok:   3–0 
Final in Bangkok:   2–3 (a.e.t.)  
Brazil defended their title, and winning it for the fifth time.

Tennis 
Davis Cup World Group, Finals, day 3 in Prague, Czech Republic:  3–2 
David Ferrer  def. Tomáš Berdych  6–2, 6–3, 7–5
Radek Štěpánek  def. Nicolás Almagro  6–4, 7–6(7–0), 3–6, 6–3
Czech Republic defeat the reigning Davis Cup champion Spain to win his first title since 1980 (as Czechoslovakia), and become the first country to win Davis Cup, Fed Cup and Hopman Cup in one year.

17 November 2012 (Saturday)

American football
NCAA Division I FBS (BCS standings in brackets):
In Waco, Texas: Baylor 52, [1] Kansas State 24.
In Eugene, Oregon: [13] Stanford 17, [2] Oregon 14 (OT).
In South Bend, Indiana: [3] Notre Dame 38, Wake Forest 0.
With these outcomes, Notre Dame becomes this season's last undefeated bowl-eligible team, with a record of 11–0, going into their season finale against USC.

Baseball
World Baseball Classic qualification:
Qualifier 3 in Panama City, Panama:
 7,  1.
 6,  2. Nicaragua is eliminated.
Qualifier 4 in New Taipei City, Taiwan:  10,  6. Philippines is eliminated.

Mixed martial arts
UFC 154 in Montreal, Quebec, Canada:
Featherweight bout: Pablo Garza  def. Mark Hominick  via unanimous decision (29–27, 30–26, 29–28)
Lightweight bout: Rafael dos Anjos  def. Mark Bocek  via unanimous decision (30–27, 30–27, 30–27)
Middleweight bout: Francis Carmont  def. Tom Lawlor  via split decision (29–28, 28–29, 29–28)
Welterweight bout: Johny Hendricks  def. Martin Kampmann  via KO (punch)
Welterweight Championship unification bout: Georges St-Pierre  (c) def. Carlos Condit  (ic) via unanimous decision (49–46, 50–45, 50–45)

Rugby union
End of year tests, Week 3:
In Tbilisi, Georgia:  22–25 
In Doncaster, England: RFU Championship XV  21–52 
In Rome, Italy:  10–42 
In London, England:  14–20 
In Edinburgh, Scotland:  10–21 
In Limerick, Republic of Ireland:  53–0 
In Villeneuve-d'Ascq, France:  39–22 
In Santiago, Chile:  22–28 
International Rugby Series, Week 2 in Colwyn Bay, Wales:
 13–22 
 35–3 
Namibian Tri-Nations in Windhoek, Namibia:  37–38

Tennis 
Davis Cup World Group, Finals, day 2 in Prague, Czech Republic:  2–1 
Tomáš Berdych/Radek Štěpánek  def. Marcel Granollers/Marc López  3–6, 7–5, 7–5, 6–3

16 November 2012 (Friday)

Baseball
World Baseball Classic qualification:
Qualifier 3 in Panama City, Panama:  8,  1.
Qualifier 4 in New Taipei City, Taiwan:
 12,  2 (F/8). Thailand is eliminated.
 16,  0 (F/7).

Rugby union
End of year tests, Week 3:
In Cardiff, Wales:  19–26

Tennis 
Davis Cup World Group, Finals, day 1 in Prague, Czech Republic:  1–1 
David Ferrer  def. Radek Štěpánek  6–3, 6–4, 6–4
Tomáš Berdych  def. Nicolás Almagro  6–3, 3–6, 6–3, 6–7(5–7), 6–3

15 November 2012 (Thursday)

Baseball
World Baseball Classic qualification:
Qualifier 3 in Panama City, Panama:  3,  2.
Qualifier 4 in New Taipei City, Taiwan:
 8,  2.
 10,  0 (F/7).

14 November 2012 (Wednesday)

Rugby union
Namibian Tri-Nations in Windhoek, Namibia:  14–47

13 November 2012 (Tuesday)

Rugby union
End of year tests, Week 3:
In Leicester, England: Leicester Tigers  32–24 
In Gloucester, England: Gloucester  31–29 
In Newcastle upon Tyne, England: Newcastle Falcons  24–13

12 November 2012 (Monday)

11 November 2012 (Sunday)

Alpine skiing
Men's World Cup:
Slalom in Levi, Finland:  André Myhrer   Marcel Hirscher   Jens Byggmark 
Overall standings (after 2 of 36 races): (1) Hirscher 140 points (2) Manfred Mölgg  130 (3) Ted Ligety  120

American football
NFL, Week 10:
In New Orleans, Louisiana: New Orleans Saints 31, Atlanta Falcons 27.
The Falcons' first loss comes on the 40th Anniversary of the unbeaten season of the 1972 Miami Dolphins, who remain the only team to accomplish such a season from opening game to Super Bowl VII.
In San Francisco, California: St. Louis Rams 24, San Francisco 49ers 24 (OT).
The Rams and the 49ers play to NFL's first tie game since 16 November 2008.

Auto racing
Sprint Cup Series – Chase for the Sprint Cup:
AdvoCare 500 in Avondale, Arizona: (1)  Kevin Harvick (Chevrolet; Richard Childress Racing) (2)  Denny Hamlin (Toyota; Joe Gibbs Racing) (3)  Kyle Busch (Toyota; Joe Gibbs Racing)
Drivers' championship standings (after 35 of 36 races): (1)  Brad Keselowski (Dodge; Penske Racing) 2371 points (2)  Jimmie Johnson (Chevrolet; Hendrick Motorsports) 2351 (3)  Kasey Kahne (Chevrolet; Hendrick Motorsports) 2321

Baseball
Asia Series Final in Busan, South Korea:  Yomiuri Giants 6,  Lamigo Monkeys 3.
The Giants win their first Asia Series championship. Giants infielder Hayato Sakamoto is named series MVP.

Canadian football
CFL playoffs:
East Division Semifinal in Toronto, Ontario: Toronto Argonauts 42, Edmonton Eskimos 26.
West Division Semifinal in Calgary, Alberta: Calgary Stampeders 36, Saskatchewan Roughriders 30.

Rugby league
Autumn International Series Final in Salford, England:  48–4

Rugby union
End of year tests, Week 2:
In Edinburgh, Scotland:  22–51 
In Montevideo, Uruguay:  25–32

10 November 2012 (Saturday)

Alpine skiing
Women's World Cup:
Slalom in Levi, Finland:  Maria Höfl-Riesch   Tanja Poutiainen   Mikaela Shiffrin 
Overall standings (after 2 of 37 races): (1) Tina Maze  150 points (2) Höfl-Riesch 124 (3) Poutiainen 91

Baseball
Asia Series in Busan, South Korea (teams in bold advance to the Final):
Group A:  Samsung Lions 9,  China Stars 0.
Group B:  Yomiuri Giants 5,  Lotte Giants 0.

Mixed martial arts
UFC on Fuel TV: Franklin vs. Le in Cotai Strip, Macau:
Bantamweight bout: Takeya Mizugaki  def. Jeff Hougland  via unanimous decision (30–25, 30–27, 30–27)
Lightweight bout: Jon Tuck  def. Zhang Tiequan  via unanimous decision (29–28, 30–27, 29–28)
Lightweight bout: Takanori Gomi  def. Mac Danzig  via split decision (28–29, 29–28, 29–28)
Welterweight bout: Dong Hyun Kim  def. Paulo Thiago  via unanimous decision (30–26, 30–27, 30–27)
Light Heavyweight bout: Thiago Silva  def. Stanislav Nedkov  via submission (arm-triangle choke)
Middleweight bout: Cung Le  def. Rich Franklin  via KO (punch)

Rugby union
End of year tests, Week 2:
In Bucharest, Romania:  23–34 
In Brescia, Italy:  28–23 
In London, England:  54–12 
In Cardiff, Wales:  12–26 
In Dublin, Republic of Ireland:  12–16 
In Saint-Denis, France:  33–6 
Namibian Tri-Nations in Windhoek, Namibia:  37–33

9 November 2012 (Friday)

Baseball
Asia Series in Busan, South Korea (teams in bold advance to the Final):
Group A:  Lamigo Monkeys 3,  Samsung Lions 0.
Group B:  Yomiuri Giants 7,  Perth Heat 1.

Rugby union
International Rugby Series, Week 1 in Colwyn Bay, Wales:
 40–26 
 12–42

8 November 2012 (Thursday)

Baseball
Asia Series in Busan, South Korea:
Group A:  Lamigo Monkeys 14,  China Stars 1 (F/7).
Group B:  Lotte Giants 6,  Perth Heat 1.

7 November 2012 (Wednesday)

 
Celtic defeat FC Barcelona 2-1 in the UEFA Champions League group stage in the week of the Scottish club's 125th anniversary.

6 November 2012 (Tuesday)

5 November 2012 (Monday)

4 November 2012 (Sunday)

Auto racing
Formula One:
Abu Dhabi Grand Prix in Abu Dhabi, United Arab Emirates: (1) Kimi Räikkönen  (Lotus–Renault) (2) Fernando Alonso  (Ferrari) (3) Sebastian Vettel  (Red Bull-Renault)
Drivers' championship standings (after 18 of 20 races): (1) Vettel 255 points (2) Alonso 245 (3) Räikkönen 198
Constructors' championship standings: (1) Red Bull-Renault 422 points (2) Ferrari 340 (3) McLaren–Mercedes 318
Sprint Cup Series – Chase for the Sprint Cup:
AAA Texas 500 in Fort Worth, Texas: (1)  Jimmie Johnson (Chevrolet; Hendrick Motorsports) (2)  Brad Keselowski (Dodge; Penske Racing) (3)  Kyle Busch (Toyota; Joe Gibbs Racing)
Drivers' championship standings (after 34 of 36 races): (1) Johnson 2339 points (2) Keselowski 2332 (3)  Clint Bowyer (Toyota; Michael Waltrip Racing) 2303

Rugby union
End of year tests, Week 1:
In Oxford, England: Oxford University  15–29

Tennis 
Fed Cup World Group, Finals, day 2 in Prague, Czech Republic:  1–3 
Ana Ivanovic  def. Petra Kvitová  6–3, 7–5
Lucie Šafářová  def. Jelena Janković  6–1, 6–1
Czech Republic win the title for the second successive year.

3 November 2012 (Saturday)

Baseball
Japan Series:
Game 6 in Bunkyo, Tokyo: Yomiuri Giants 4, Hokkaido Nippon-Ham Fighters 3. Giants win series 4–2.
The Giants win the Japan Series for the first time since 2009, and the 22nd time overall. Giants pitcher Tetsuya Utsumi is named series MVP.

Rugby league
Autumn International Series:
In Hull, England:  44–6

Tennis 
Fed Cup World Group, Finals, day 1 in Prague, Czech Republic:  0–2 
Lucie Šafářová  def. Ana Ivanovic  6–4, 6–3
Petra Kvitová  def. Jelena Janković  6–4, 6–1

2 November 2012 (Friday)

1 November 2012 (Thursday)

Baseball
Japan Series:
Game 5 in Sapporo, Hokkaido: Yomiuri Giants 10, Hokkaido Nippon-Ham Fighters 2. Giants lead series 3–2.

References

XI
November 2012 sports events